Hilopites or hylopites are a traditional Greek pasta made from flour, eggs, milk, and salt. They take the form of small squares or, in some regions, long thin strips (usually called by different names) similar to Italian fettuccine.

The pasta is traditionally made by rolling the dough out in to a thin sheet, dusting with flour, and slicing twice: first into thin fettuccine like strips, then again into small squares. While commercially produced hilopites are generally around  traditional homemade hilopites are often made much larger.

Some common dishes made with hilopites are chicken noodle soups, baked chicken with red sauce, or simple boiled pasta dish with oil and cheese.

See also
 Flomaria
 Crozets de Savoie
 Lazanki
 List of pasta

Notes

Greek cuisine
Greek pasta
Types of pasta